Paul Davis (born 12 March 1971) is an Australian former rugby league footballer who played professionally for the Balmain Tigers.

Playing career
Davis played forty matches for the Balmain Tigers between 1992 and 1993.

In 1992 he represented the Australian Aboriginies side at the Pacific Cup.

Davis also played Group 2 Rugby League for Port Macquarie, Macksville and Dunghutti.

Later years
Davis coached Dunghutti in 2008.

In 2009 his 15-year-old son, Paul Davis-Welsh, was killed in a car crash. Davis-Welsh was a promising junior and had signed with the Gold Coast Titans under 16s. A memorial golf tournament was later set up in his name.

In 2009 Davis was named in the 2000–2009 Group 2 Team of the Decade.

References

1971 births
Living people
Australian rugby league coaches
Australian rugby league players
Indigenous Australian rugby league players
Australian Aboriginal rugby league team players
Balmain Tigers players
Rugby league centres
Rugby league five-eighths
Rugby league players from Thursday Island